Shedsu-nefertum was a High Priest of Ptah at the end of the Twenty-first Dynasty of Egypt and beginning of the Twenty-second Dynasty. Shedsunefertem was the son of the High Priest Ankhefensekhmet and the lady Tapeshenese, who was First Chief of the Harem of Ptah and Prophetess of Mut.

Shedsu-nefertum had two wives. One of his wives was named Mehtenweskhet, who was probably a daughter of Nimlot A and Tentsepeh A. She was thus a sister of Shoshenq I. The other wife was named Tentsepeh B. She may have been a daughter of Psusennes II.

References

Ancient Egyptian priests
Memphis High Priests of Ptah
People of the Twenty-first Dynasty of Egypt
People of the Twenty-second Dynasty of Egypt
10th-century BC clergy